The Magic Show is a one-act musical with music and lyrics by Stephen Schwartz and a book by Bob Randall. It starred magician Doug Henning. Produced by Edgar Lansbury, Joseph Beruh, and Ivan Reitman, it opened on May 28, 1974 at the Cort Theatre in Manhattan, and ran for 1,920 performances, closing on December 31, 1978. Henning was nominated for the Tony Award for Best Featured Actor in a Musical and director Grover Dale was nominated for the Tony Award for Best Direction of a Musical.

It originally began life as Spellbound, produced by Ivan Reitman with a book by David Cronenberg and music by Howard Shore. That version premiered at the Royal Alexandra Theatre in Toronto in 1973, starring Henning and Jennifer Dale.  When Reitman took it to New York, the book and score were entirely replaced, but Henning's illusions and magic tricks remained unchanged.

The Magic Show was a rare Broadway musical with a star who could neither sing nor dance. As composer-lyricist Stephen Schwartz told critic Peter Filichia, "This wasn't the case of writing for a star, but writing around a star."

Synopsis
The setting for the show is a seedy nightclub, the Top Hat, where an aging alcoholic magician, "Feldman the Magnificent," chews the scenery in his overly grand performance.  Manny, the Top Hat owner, wants to replace him and brings in Doug.  Doug is very unconventional and has an assistant named Cal.  Cal is in love with Doug, but he does not notice her and is focused on advancing his career.  Donna and Dina are the rock act in the club.  One of them dates the nephew of a big agent named Goldfarb. Goldfarb is coming to the club to check out Donna and Dina's act, and everyone is excited.

Meanwhile, Doug pays little attention to Cal and decides that he needs a "beautiful assistant". Cal is hurt, as Doug conjures up the beautiful Charmin.  Donna and Dina get jealous, and along with Feldman, plot to expose the secrets to Doug's tricks during the show.  Doug finally realizes he loves Cal, and gets to her before she leaves. Charmin is sent back to wherever she came from, and all ends up well.

Musical numbers
Up to His Old Tricks - Entire Company
Solid Silver Platform Shoes - Dina and Donna
Lion Tamer - Cal
Style - Feldman and Company
Charmin's Lament - Charmin
Two's Company - Dina and Donna
The Goldfarb Variations - Dina, Feldman, Donna, Manny and Charmin
Doug's Act - Doug
A Bit of Villainy - Feldman, Dina and Donna
West End Avenue - Cal
Sweet, Sweet, Sweet - Charmin, Manny, Mike and Steve
Before Your Very Eyes - Dina, Donna and Feldman

Opening night cast
Cheryl Barnes,  Dina
Doug Henning,  Doug (later replaced by Jeffrey Mylett and the character name was changed to "Jeff", then later Joe Abaldo took over the role of "Joe.")
Robert LuPone,  Manny
Annie McGreevey,  Donna
Anita Morris (later replaced by Loni Ackerman),  Charmin
Lloyd Sannes,  Steve
Sam Schacht,  Goldfarb
Dale Soules,  Cal
Ronald Stafford,  Mike
David Ogden Stiers,  Feldman

Opening night band
Stephen Reinhardt, keyboards, musical director
Paul Shaffer,  keyboards
Steve Manes,  bass
Brian McCormick,  guitar
Gerry Weiner,  guitar
Joey Saulter,  drums
Charles Birch, percussion

Reception
Reviews for the show were mixed. In the New York Times, Clive Barnes wrote what he called “an adulterated rave,” because “Mr. Henning is terrific. He is the greatest illusionist I have ever seen … On the other hand, the show is awful. This is a 'Magic Show' where they should keep the magic and abandon the show.” The Times’ Sunday critic Walter Kerr concurred that “If the star of the occasion, magician Doug Henning, were entirely serious about his business, he would promptly make the rest of the show disappear.” However, Kerr concluded that “the show is the kind that parents will take children to on the pretext that they are doing the children a favor. But they go for their own fun, really.”

Some critics were fonder of the show. In One More Kiss, his book surveying Broadway musicals of the 1970s, Ethan Mordden wrote that the show’ success was “first, because Henning really did have a wonderful act, and, second, because the frame was amusing enough. Director-choreographer Grover Dale gave it atmosphere, David Ogden Stiers as the cast-off magician was a wily piece of camp, and Schwartz’s score is capable and surprising.” At least one of the songs, “West End Avenue,” became a standard; Peter Filichia wrote that it was “one of the most popular cabaret songs of the late ‘70s.”

DVD version
In 2001, a filmed performance staged especially for the cameras in 1980, directed by Norman Campbell at the Queen Elizabeth Theatre in Toronto, was issued on DVD by Image Entertainment. This production, originally intended for cinema release, differed notably from the original Broadway production, with several of the most memorable songs, such as "West End Avenue" and "Solid Silver Platform Shoes", removed. Doug Henning reprised his original starring role, while Didi Conn co-starred as Cal.

References

External links

Information about the DVD of the show and recordings of songs from the show by other Broadway stars
Australian Production of THE MAGIC SHOW on YouTube

1974 musicals
Broadway musicals
One-act musicals
Musicals by Stephen Schwartz